Marc Anthony (born 28 March 1978) is a former Scottish football player.

Career
Anthony began his career with one appearance for Celtic, before playing for Scottish lower league clubs Forfar and Berwick. In 2007, he moved to Australia where he first played for Football West State League team ECU Joondalup before joining the Stirling Lions. In November 2008 he joined A-League outfit Perth Glory. In 2010, he joined Cockburn City and won the WA State League player of the year for the 2010 season.

A-League statistics
(Accurate as of 25 November 2008)

References

External links
Perth Glory profile

Career statistics

1978 births
A-League Men players
Berwick Rangers F.C. players
Celtic F.C. players
Clydebank F.C. (1965) players
Expatriate soccer players in Australia
Forfar Athletic F.C. players
Living people
Perth Glory FC players
Scottish expatriate footballers
Scottish Football League players
Scotland under-21 international footballers
Footballers from Edinburgh
Tranmere Rovers F.C. players
Association football midfielders
Scottish expatriate sportspeople in Australia
Scottish footballers